The following is a list of episodes of Wait Wait... Don't Tell Me!, NPR's news quiz program, that aired during 2002.  All episodes, unless otherwise indicated, were hosted by Peter Sagal, with Carl Kassell serving as announcer & scorekeeper.  Dates indicated were the episodes' original air dates.  Job titles of the guests reflect their job position or status at the time of their appearance.


January

February

March

April

May

June

July

August

September

October

November

December

External links
Wait Wait... Don't Tell Me! Archives
WWDT.Me, an unofficial Wait Wait historical site

Wait Wait... Don't Tell Me!
Wait Wait Don't Tell Me
Wait Wait Don't Tell Me